Shun Pong O is a Malaysian romantic comedy film.

References

External links 

Malaysian romantic comedy films
2018 romantic comedy films